The 1959 VFL season was the 63rd season of the Victorian Football League (VFL), the highest level senior Australian rules football competition in Victoria. The season featured twelve clubs, ran from 18 April until 26 September, and comprised an 18-game home-and-away season followed by a finals series featuring the top four clubs.

The premiership was won by the Melbourne Football Club for the tenth time, after it defeated  by 37 points in the 1959 VFL Grand Final.

Premiership season
In 1959, the VFL competition consisted of twelve teams of 18 on-the-field players each, plus two substitute players, known as the 19th man and the 20th man. A player could be substituted for any reason; however, once substituted, a player could not return to the field of play under any circumstances.

Teams played each other in a home-and-away season of 18 rounds; matches 12 to 18 were the "home-and-way reverse" of matches 1 to 7.

Once the 18 round home-and-away season had finished, the 1959 VFL Premiers were determined by the specific format and conventions of the Page–McIntyre system.

Round 1

|- bgcolor="#CCCCFF"
| Home team
| Home team score
| Away team
| Away team score
| Venue
| Crowd
| Date
|- bgcolor="#FFFFFF"
| 
| 8.15 (63)
| 
| 12.14 (86)
| Kardinia Park
| 17,200
| 18 April 1959
|- bgcolor="#FFFFFF"
| 
| 19.17 (131)
| 
| 17.18 (120)
| Brunswick Street Oval
| 18,000
| 18 April 1959
|- bgcolor="#FFFFFF"
| 
| 7.18 (60)
| 
| 14.17 (101)
| Victoria Park
| 40,125
| 18 April 1959
|- bgcolor="#FFFFFF"
| 
| 13.20 (98)
| 
| 11.18 (84)
| Princes Park
| 30,000
| 18 April 1959
|- bgcolor="#FFFFFF"
| 
| 10.10 (70)
| 
| 16.21 (117)
| Punt Road Oval
| 21,500
| 18 April 1959
|- bgcolor="#FFFFFF"
| 
| 9.15 (69)
| 
| 6.13 (49)
| Junction Oval
| 27,600
| 18 April 1959

Round 2

|- bgcolor="#CCCCFF"
| Home team
| Home team score
| Away team
| Away team score
| Venue
| Crowd
| Date
|- bgcolor="#FFFFFF"
| 
| 16.12 (108)
| 
| 10.20 (80)
| Arden Street Oval
| 12,000
| 2 May 1959
|- bgcolor="#FFFFFF"
| 
| 18.15 (123)
| 
| 12.15 (87)
| Windy Hill
| 19,000
| 2 May 1959
|- bgcolor="#FFFFFF"
| 
| 18.15 (123)
| 
| 12.12 (84)
| Glenferrie Oval
| 14,000
| 2 May 1959
|- bgcolor="#FFFFFF"
| 
| 13.21 (99)
| 
| 12.11 (83)
| Lake Oval
| 27,250
| 2 May 1959
|- bgcolor="#FFFFFF"
| 
| 13.14 (92)
| 
| 12.7 (79)
| MCG
| 53,342
| 2 May 1959
|- bgcolor="#FFFFFF"
| 
| 8.7 (55)
| 
| 15.14 (104)
| Western Oval
| 29,438
| 2 May 1959

Round 3

|- bgcolor="#CCCCFF"
| Home team
| Home team score
| Away team
| Away team score
| Venue
| Crowd
| Date
|- bgcolor="#FFFFFF"
| 
| 9.9 (63)
| 
| 8.10 (58)
| Arden Street Oval
| 13,600
| 9 May 1959
|- bgcolor="#FFFFFF"
| 
| 8.10 (58)
| 
| 15.12 (102)
| Western Oval
| 17,417
| 9 May 1959
|- bgcolor="#FFFFFF"
| 
| 13.9 (87)
| 
| 11.8 (74)
| Brunswick Street Oval
| 20,000
| 9 May 1959
|- bgcolor="#FFFFFF"
| 
| 10.11 (71)
| 
| 14.12 (96)
| Punt Road Oval
| 13,500
| 9 May 1959
|- bgcolor="#FFFFFF"
| 
| 9.11 (65)
| 
| 7.10 (52)
| Lake Oval
| 30,200
| 9 May 1959
|- bgcolor="#FFFFFF"
| 
| 9.8 (62)
| 
| 14.10 (94)
| Victoria Park
| 33,903
| 9 May 1959

Round 4

|- bgcolor="#CCCCFF"
| Home team
| Home team score
| Away team
| Away team score
| Venue
| Crowd
| Date
|- bgcolor="#FFFFFF"
| 
| 19.14 (128)
| 
| 13.19 (97)
| Glenferrie Oval
| 25,000
| 16 May 1959
|- bgcolor="#FFFFFF"
| 
| 8.14 (62)
| 
| 11.11 (77)
| Windy Hill
| 22,500
| 16 May 1959
|- bgcolor="#FFFFFF"
| 
| 14.17 (101)
| 
| 9.7 (61)
| Princes Park
| 24,500
| 16 May 1959
|- bgcolor="#FFFFFF"
| 
| 19.17 (131)
| 
| 9.12 (66)
| MCG
| 24,538
| 16 May 1959
|- bgcolor="#FFFFFF"
| 
| 13.12 (90)
| 
| 12.8 (80)
| Kardinia Park
| 16,112
| 16 May 1959
|- bgcolor="#FFFFFF"
| 
| 12.19 (91)
| 
| 8.16 (64)
| Junction Oval
| 35,260
| 16 May 1959

Round 5

|- bgcolor="#CCCCFF"
| Home team
| Home team score
| Away team
| Away team score
| Venue
| Crowd
| Date
|- bgcolor="#FFFFFF"
| 
| 17.11 (113)
| 
| 13.8 (86)
| Western Oval
| 19,475
| 23 May 1959
|- bgcolor="#FFFFFF"
| 
| 11.18 (84)
| 
| 7.12 (54)
| Windy Hill
| 18,000
| 23 May 1959
|- bgcolor="#FFFFFF"
| 
| 10.13 (73)
| 
| 9.7 (61)
| Princes Park
| 36,120
| 23 May 1959
|- bgcolor="#FFFFFF"
| 
| 10.21 (81)
| 
| 11.11 (77)
| Junction Oval
| 21,500
| 23 May 1959
|- bgcolor="#FFFFFF"
| 
| 11.10 (76)
| 
| 9.19 (73)
| Arden Street Oval
| 15,000
| 23 May 1959
|- bgcolor="#FFFFFF"
| 
| 13.20 (98)
| 
| 11.13 (79)
| Punt Road Oval
| 24,000
| 23 May 1959

Round 6

|- bgcolor="#CCCCFF"
| Home team
| Home team score
| Away team
| Away team score
| Venue
| Crowd
| Date
|- bgcolor="#FFFFFF"
| 
| 11.17 (83)
| 
| 16.10 (106)
| Punt Road Oval
| 23,000
| 30 May 1959
|- bgcolor="#FFFFFF"
| 
| 11.10 (76)
| 
| 19.15 (129)
| Kardinia Park
| 16,736
| 30 May 1959
|- bgcolor="#FFFFFF"
| 
| 16.16 (112)
| 
| 10.11 (71)
| Victoria Park
| 24,740
| 30 May 1959
|- bgcolor="#FFFFFF"
| 
| 8.18 (66)
| 
| 13.18 (96)
| Lake Oval
| 20,700
| 30 May 1959
|- bgcolor="#FFFFFF"
| 
| 11.9 (75)
| 
| 12.22 (94)
| Brunswick Street Oval
| 22,000
| 30 May 1959
|- bgcolor="#FFFFFF"
| 
| 11.9 (75)
| 
| 12.11 (83)
| Glenferrie Oval
| 28,000
| 30 May 1959

Round 7

|- bgcolor="#CCCCFF"
| Home team
| Home team score
| Away team
| Away team score
| Venue
| Crowd
| Date
|- bgcolor="#FFFFFF"
| 
| 14.17 (101)
| 
| 8.8 (56)
| MCG
| 27,829
| 6 June 1959
|- bgcolor="#FFFFFF"
| 
| 14.9 (93)
| 
| 8.15 (63)
| Glenferrie Oval
| 14,500
| 6 June 1959
|- bgcolor="#FFFFFF"
| 
| 15.11 (101)
| 
| 12.13 (85)
| Windy Hill
| 23,000
| 6 June 1959
|- bgcolor="#FFFFFF"
| 
| 12.22 (94)
| 
| 9.7 (61)
| Victoria Park
| 20,427
| 6 June 1959
|- bgcolor="#FFFFFF"
| 
| 14.15 (99)
| 
| 10.11 (71)
| Princes Park
| 41,985
| 6 June 1959
|- bgcolor="#FFFFFF"
| 
| 13.9 (87)
| 
| 9.26 (80)
| Junction Oval
| 20,200
| 6 June 1959

Round 8

|- bgcolor="#CCCCFF"
| Home team
| Home team score
| Away team
| Away team score
| Venue
| Crowd
| Date
|- bgcolor="#FFFFFF"
| 
| 4.13 (37)
| 
| 9.9 (63)
| Western Oval
| 11,533
| 13 June 1959
|- bgcolor="#FFFFFF"
| 
| 12.12 (84)
| 
| 8.6 (54)
| Arden Street Oval
| 12,500
| 13 June 1959
|- bgcolor="#FFFFFF"
| 
| 5.10 (40)
| 
| 3.12 (30)
| Brunswick Street Oval
| 17,632
| 13 June 1959
|- bgcolor="#FFFFFF"
| 
| 16.13 (109)
| 
| 7.11 (53)
| Lake Oval
| 29,500
| 15 June 1959
|- bgcolor="#FFFFFF"
| 
| 19.15 (129)
| 
| 8.8 (56)
| MCG
| 52,880
| 15 June 1959
|- bgcolor="#FFFFFF"
| 
| 11.13 (79)
| 
| 12.16 (88)
| Kardinia Park
| 11,533
| 15 June 1959

Round 9

|- bgcolor="#CCCCFF"
| Home team
| Home team score
| Away team
| Away team score
| Venue
| Crowd
| Date
|- bgcolor="#FFFFFF"
| 
| 6.16 (52)
| 
| 11.11 (77)
| Glenferrie Oval
| 17,000
| 27 June 1959
|- bgcolor="#FFFFFF"
| 
| 14.11 (95)
| 
| 14.21 (105)
| Princes Park
| 33,150
| 27 June 1959
|- bgcolor="#FFFFFF"
| 
| 14.11 (95)
| 
| 6.22 (58)
| Junction Oval
| 15,650
| 27 June 1959
|- bgcolor="#FFFFFF"
| 
| 13.18 (96)
| 
| 9.14 (68)
| Arden Street Oval
| 13,000
| 27 June 1959
|- bgcolor="#FFFFFF"
| 
| 13.8 (86)
| 
| 10.21 (81)
| Punt Road Oval
| 13,000
| 27 June 1959
|- bgcolor="#FFFFFF"
| 
| 8.11 (59)
| 
| 14.12 (96)
| Windy Hill
| 23,000
| 27 June 1959

Round 10

|- bgcolor="#CCCCFF"
| Home team
| Home team score
| Away team
| Away team score
| Venue
| Crowd
| Date
|- bgcolor="#FFFFFF"
| 
| 10.13 (73)
| 
| 15.16 (106)
| Punt Road Oval
| 21,000
| 4 July 1959
|- bgcolor="#FFFFFF"
| 
| 11.18 (84)
| 
| 9.9 (63)
| Victoria Park
| 25,149
| 4 July 1959
|- bgcolor="#FFFFFF"
| 
| 11.10 (76)
| 
| 9.23 (77)
| Junction Oval
| 23,800
| 4 July 1959
|- bgcolor="#FFFFFF"
| 
| 13.15 (93)
| 
| 10.15 (75)
| Kardinia Park
| 14,150
| 4 July 1959
|- bgcolor="#FFFFFF"
| 
| 14.13 (97)
| 
| 12.20 (92)
| Glenferrie Oval
| 15,500
| 4 July 1959
|- bgcolor="#FFFFFF"
| 
| 21.13 (139)
| 
| 10.13 (73)
| Brunswick Street Oval
| 26,000
| 4 July 1959

Round 11

|- bgcolor="#CCCCFF"
| Home team
| Home team score
| Away team
| Away team score
| Venue
| Crowd
| Date
|- bgcolor="#FFFFFF"
| 
| 20.8 (128)
| 
| 6.10 (46)
| MCG
| 31,263
| 11 July 1959
|- bgcolor="#FFFFFF"
| 
| 19.20 (134)
| 
| 10.9 (69)
| Windy Hill
| 17,000
| 11 July 1959
|- bgcolor="#FFFFFF"
| 
| 10.15 (75)
| 
| 10.14 (74)
| Victoria Park
| 24,502
| 11 July 1959
|- bgcolor="#FFFFFF"
| 
| 15.21 (111)
| 
| 8.18 (66)
| Princes Park
| 27,668
| 11 July 1959
|- bgcolor="#FFFFFF"
| 
| 17.16 (118)
| 
| 12.12 (84)
| Lake Oval
| 16,600
| 11 July 1959
|- bgcolor="#FFFFFF"
| 
| 6.17 (53)
| 
| 10.13 (73)
| Western Oval
| 15,801
| 11 July 1959

Round 12

|- bgcolor="#CCCCFF"
| Home team
| Home team score
| Away team
| Away team score
| Venue
| Crowd
| Date
|- bgcolor="#FFFFFF"
| 
| 13.10 (88)
| 
| 7.9 (51)
| MCG
| 21,979
| 18 July 1959
|- bgcolor="#FFFFFF"
| 
| 10.15 (75)
| 
| 12.14 (86)
| Western Oval
| 16,189
| 18 July 1959
|- bgcolor="#FFFFFF"
| 
| 11.10 (76)
| 
| 8.15 (63)
| Arden Street Oval
| 10,000
| 18 July 1959
|- bgcolor="#FFFFFF"
| 
| 8.13 (61)
| 
| 8.19 (67)
| Glenferrie Oval
| 15,500
| 18 July 1959
|- bgcolor="#FFFFFF"
| 
| 6.9 (45)
| 
| 12.13 (85)
| Lake Oval
| 40,000
| 18 July 1959
|- bgcolor="#FFFFFF"
| 
| 15.10 (100)
| 
| 7.18 (60)
| Windy Hill
| 28,000
| 18 July 1959

Round 13

|- bgcolor="#CCCCFF"
| Home team
| Home team score
| Away team
| Away team score
| Venue
| Crowd
| Date
|- bgcolor="#FFFFFF"
| 
| 14.16 (100)
| 
| 13.13 (91)
| Kardinia Park
| 10,072
| 25 July 1959
|- bgcolor="#FFFFFF"
| 
| 13.19 (97)
| 
| 10.7 (67)
| Brunswick Street Oval
| 17,024
| 25 July 1959
|- bgcolor="#FFFFFF"
| 
| 14.10 (94)
| 
| 14.7 (91)
| Victoria Park
| 30,343
| 25 July 1959
|- bgcolor="#FFFFFF"
| 
| 9.9 (63)
| 
| 6.11 (47)
| Princes Park
| 13,271
| 25 July 1959
|- bgcolor="#FFFFFF"
| 
| 16.8 (104)
| 
| 10.16 (76)
| Punt Road Oval
| 8,000
| 25 July 1959
|- bgcolor="#FFFFFF"
| 
| 12.13 (85)
| 
| 11.5 (71)
| Junction Oval
| 18,100
| 25 July 1959

Round 14

|- bgcolor="#CCCCFF"
| Home team
| Home team score
| Away team
| Away team score
| Venue
| Crowd
| Date
|- bgcolor="#FFFFFF"
| 
| 12.15 (87)
| 
| 6.7 (43)
| Kardinia Park
| 12,140
| 1 August 1959
|- bgcolor="#FFFFFF"
| 
| 10.19 (79)
| 
| 8.14 (62)
| Windy Hill
| 20,000
| 1 August 1959
|- bgcolor="#FFFFFF"
| 
| 8.9 (57)
| 
| 9.14 (68)
| Princes Park
| 41,581
| 1 August 1959
|- bgcolor="#FFFFFF"
| 
| 10.15 (75)
| 
| 13.7 (85)
| Junction Oval
| 17,500
| 1 August 1959
|- bgcolor="#FFFFFF"
| 
| 14.15 (99)
| 
| 7.10 (52)
| Glenferrie Oval
| 10,000
| 1 August 1959
|- bgcolor="#FFFFFF"
| 
| 11.11 (77)
| 
| 11.11 (77)
| MCG
| 29,320
| 1 August 1959

Round 15

|- bgcolor="#CCCCFF"
| Home team
| Home team score
| Away team
| Away team score
| Venue
| Crowd
| Date
|- bgcolor="#FFFFFF"
| 
| 12.8 (80)
| 
| 10.11 (71)
| Western Oval
| 12,549
| 8 August 1959
|- bgcolor="#FFFFFF"
| 
| 11.15 (81)
| 
| 6.11 (47)
| Brunswick Street Oval
| 14,488
| 8 August 1959
|- bgcolor="#FFFFFF"
| 
| 12.18 (90)
| 
| 9.11 (65)
| Victoria Park
| 29,178
| 8 August 1959
|- bgcolor="#FFFFFF"
| 
| 8.14 (62)
| 
| 10.3 (63)
| Lake Oval
| 13,000
| 8 August 1959
|- bgcolor="#FFFFFF"
| 
| 11.8 (74)
| 
| 16.14 (110)
| Arden Street Oval
| 18,500
| 8 August 1959
|- bgcolor="#FFFFFF"
| 
| 13.6 (84)
| 
| 14.20 (104)
| Punt Road Oval
| 16,000
| 8 August 1959

Round 16

|- bgcolor="#CCCCFF"
| Home team
| Home team score
| Away team
| Away team score
| Venue
| Crowd
| Date
|- bgcolor="#FFFFFF"
| 
| 10.11 (71)
| 
| 5.5 (35)
| Glenferrie Oval
| 12,000
| 15 August 1959
|- bgcolor="#FFFFFF"
| 
| 10.23 (83)
| 
| 7.11 (53)
| Brunswick Street Oval
| 14,774
| 15 August 1959
|- bgcolor="#FFFFFF"
| 
| 17.17 (119)
| 
| 5.10 (40)
| Victoria Park
| 23,856
| 15 August 1959
|- bgcolor="#FFFFFF"
| 
| 11.10 (76)
| 
| 12.13 (85)
| Lake Oval
| 14,100
| 15 August 1959
|- bgcolor="#FFFFFF"
| 
| 12.9 (81)
| 
| 15.16 (106)
| Kardinia Park
| 15,076
| 15 August 1959
|- bgcolor="#FFFFFF"
| 
| 13.14 (92)
| 
| 7.5 (47)
| MCG
| 53,479
| 15 August 1959

Round 17

|- bgcolor="#CCCCFF"
| Home team
| Home team score
| Away team
| Away team score
| Venue
| Crowd
| Date
|- bgcolor="#FFFFFF"
| 
| 6.6 (42)
| 
| 19.20 (134)
| Arden Street Oval
| 12,500
| 22 August 1959
|- bgcolor="#FFFFFF"
| 
| 11.8 (74)
| 
| 7.12 (54)
| Windy Hill
| 30,000
| 22 August 1959
|- bgcolor="#FFFFFF"
| 
| 13.20 (98)
| 
| 14.12 (96)
| Princes Park
| 18,720
| 22 August 1959
|- bgcolor="#FFFFFF"
| 
| 18.15 (123)
| 
| 13.19 (97)
| Junction Oval
| 14,500
| 22 August 1959
|- bgcolor="#FFFFFF"
| 
| 17.18 (120)
| 
| 9.12 (66)
| MCG
| 21,646
| 22 August 1959
|- bgcolor="#FFFFFF"
| 
| 5.5 (35)
| 
| 8.17 (65)
| Western Oval
| 33,960
| 22 August 1959

Round 18

|- bgcolor="#CCCCFF"
| Home team
| Home team score
| Away team
| Away team score
| Venue
| Crowd
| Date
|- bgcolor="#FFFFFF"
| 
| 20.12 (132)
| 
| 13.12 (90)
| Brunswick Street Oval
| 18,253
| 29 August 1959
|- bgcolor="#FFFFFF"
| 
| 8.13 (61)
| 
| 10.16 (76)
| Lake Oval
| 22,500
| 29 August 1959
|- bgcolor="#FFFFFF"
| 
| 10.13 (73)
| 
| 17.14 (116)
| Punt Road Oval
| 10,000
| 29 August 1959
|- bgcolor="#FFFFFF"
| 
| 10.14 (74)
| 
| 17.15 (117)
| Western Oval
| 29,629
| 29 August 1959
|- bgcolor="#FFFFFF"
| 
| 5.8 (38)
| 
| 17.19 (121)
| Kardinia Park
| 21,822
| 29 August 1959
|- bgcolor="#FFFFFF"
| 
| 8.11 (59)
| 
| 12.14 (86)
| Arden Street Oval
| 23,200
| 29 August 1959

Ladder

Consolation Night Series Competition
The night series were held under the floodlights at Lake Oval, South Melbourne, for the teams (5th to 12th on ladder) out of the finals at the end of the season.

Final: Fitzroy 10.10 (70) defeated Hawthorn 4.16 (40)

Premiership Finals

First Semi-Final

Second Semi-Final

Preliminary Final

Grand final

Awards
 The 1959 VFL Premiership team was Melbourne.
 The VFL's leading goalkicker was Ron Evans of Essendon who kicked 79 goals (including 10 goals in the final series).
 The winner of the 1959 Brownlow Medal was Bob Skilton of South Melbourne with 20 votes. He won on a count-back from Verdun Howell of St Kilda.
As a consequence of its 1981 decision to change its rules relating to tied Brownlow Medal contests, the AFL awarded a retrospective medal to Verdun Howell in 1989.
 Footscray took the "wooden spoon" in 1959.

Notable events
 The VFL threatened to move matches away from Windy Hill and the St Kilda Cricket Ground at the start of the season owing to a dispute with the Essendon and St Kilda Cricket Clubs. Cricket club members were entitled to purchase football club season tickets for one third of face value, but 1957–58 cricket club members had paid for their 1958 football tickets at 1957 prices instead of 1958 prices. Following a ruling by the state Minister for Lands, the cricket clubs paid the balance in mid-April, and no matches were moved.
 The committee of the Essendon, fifth on the ladder at the end of 1958, took the innovative step of employing Bert Willee, the chief lecturer in physical education at the University of Melbourne, to design and supervise the delivery of a carefully planned programme of physical training for each player, taking into account the special requirements of each playing position, as well as concentrating on the special needs of each individual player. Essendon played in the 1959 Grand Final, having finished the season in fourth place.
 From 1959, VFL Second Eighteens' matches and were played as curtain-raisers to seniors matches, having previously been played at the same time as the seniors at a different venue. The Third Eighteens' matches were now played at a different venue to the seniors, having been played as the main curtain-raiser until 1958.
 The VFL introduced the premiership cup, to be awarded to the Premiership team immediately after the Grand Final Match.
 As Carlton team was running down the players race at the Brunswick Street Oval before the start of its round 10 match against Fitzroy, Carlton centre half-back Bob Crowe stumbled and fell, badly injuring his knee (before he had reached the playing field). A short time after the match began, it was obvious that Crowe was in great pain and was totally unable to keep up with the play. Carlton appealed to the field umpire, and they were allowed to substitute one of their reserves for Crowe, even though he had taken the field.
 The Collingwood Secretary, Gordon Carlyon and four Collingwood footballers received death threats before the Round 14 match against Carlton that are thought to have been connected with a potential betting plunge.
 Despite losing its first five matches, the 1958 premiers Collingwood reached the final four.

References
 Maplestone, M., Flying Higher: History of the Essendon Football Club 1872–1996, Essendon Football Club, (Melbourne), 1996. 
 Rogers, S. & Brown, A., Every Game Ever Played: VFL/AFL Results 1897–1997 (Sixth Edition), Viking Books, (Ringwood), 1998. 
 Ross, J. (ed), 100 Years of Australian Football 1897–1996: The Complete Story of the AFL, All the Big Stories, All the Great Pictures, All the Champions, Every AFL Season Reported, Viking, (Ringwood), 1996. 

Notes

External links
 1959 Season – AFL Tables

Australian Football League seasons
VFL season